Maxwell David Wagner (born August 19, 2001) is an American baseball third baseman who plays in the Baltimore Orioles organization. He played college baseball for the Clemson Tigers.

Amateur career
Wagner grew up in Green Bay, Wisconsin and attended Preble High School. He was named the Wisconsin Gatorade Baseball Player of the Year as a senior. Wagner played summer collegiate baseball after graduating high school for the Green Bay Booyah of the Northwoods League.

Wagner played in 35 games with 22 starts at third base during his freshman season and batted .214 with five doubles, two home runs, nine RBIs, and 16 runs scored. He returned to Green Bay after the season and was named a league All-Star. Wagner altered his swing during the summer. In his two seasons in Green Bay, he hit .285 with six home runs and 22 runs batted in. He had an OPS of .923 in 175 plate appearances. He was named the Atlantic Coast Conference (ACC) Player of the Week twice in a row during his sophomore season. Wagner was named the Atlantic Coast Conference Baseball Player of the Year at the end of the regular season.

Professional career
The Baltimore Orioles selected Wagner 42nd overall in the 2022 Major League Baseball draft. He signed with the Orioles on July 26, 2022, and received a $1.9 million signing bonus.

References

External links

Clemson Tigers bio

Living people
Baseball third basemen
Clemson Tigers baseball players
Baseball players from Wisconsin
Sportspeople from Green Bay, Wisconsin
2001 births
All-American college baseball players